Jang Ho-geun (born 11 September 1977), known professionally as Jang Minho, is a South Korean singer. He competed in the TV Chosun audition show Mr. Trot, placing in the top sixth. He is also a model, dancer, and TV presenter.

Early life 
Jang Ho-geun was born on September 11, 1977, in Busan and moved to Incheon while he was little. He is the youngest of three siblings. He has a brother and a sister. When he was a high school student, he went to acting school in Seoul from Incheon and did modeling for various TV commercials.

Career

Singer debut as a leader of an idol group U-BeS (1997–1999) 
Jang started his musical career as a leader of the Korean idol group U-BeS in 1997. At that time, he used his real name. He spent a year before debut as a trainee for practicing singing and dancing with his group members. The group released two regular albums but disbanded due to poor album sales and disagreements with the agency. He revealed in a 2020 interview that they were often physically beaten by the head of the agency. Those events gave Jang severe mental trauma, and he later contemplated about quitting the entertainment industry. U-BeS' official time of disbandment was never been announced officially, however the 2011 interview with CJ E&M enewsWorld reported it was 1999.

K-Pop duo Baram (2004–2005) 

After five years of hiatus, he formed a pop duo Baram (meaning 'wind' in Korean) with Seo Woo in 2004. Baram released the album Just like a wind. He used the stage name Jang-goon. Son Dam-bi before her debut appeared in their music video To Love (사랑하다). Baram wasn't successful in Korea though they received some attention in China.

Beginnings as a trot singer (2011–2019) 

Jang was enlisted in 2007 and was released in 2009. He graduated from graduate school (Performing Arts Major in Dankook Graduate School of Cultural Arts and Design), and tried to get a job as a steward in a foreign airline with his Chinese skills. Jang met the CEO of his current agency(a manager back then) in grad school, and was persuaded into making a comeback. In 2011 after a year of preparation, he released his trot debut single, Love you, Nuna using his new stage name Jang Minho. His first trot single was a commercial failure. In 2012 he participated KBS's audition show 'Last audition of my life' and won the contest along with singer-songwriter, LEN as a duo. Despite Jang and LEN won the contest, KBS hasn't done any support as they promised for the show's final winners. Two months after the contest Jang released the EP The Man Says (남자는 말합니다). Although the album did not get much attention when released, the title song "The Man Says" began to gain popularity and became his signature song. The song earned him a nickname omtongnyong (a compound word of mom and president).

Mr. Trot and popularity (2020–present) 

In 2020 he was a finalist on the Mr. Trot reality television show, placing sixth. Mr. Trot surpassed a 30 percent viewership rating, highest was 35.7 percent and over 7.7 million text message-based votes were cast during the two-hour program, a record for TV audition shows. Owing to his popularity after the competition, he won first place in a survey to "pick the best trot singer," with 294,730 votes. Also, he ranked fifteenth on a Singer Brand Reputation rank of July 2020. The same year he created his YouTube channel and gained over 20,000 subscribers in 2 hours. He is an advertising model and spokesperson. According to Ildong Foodis, they increased the product sales 7.8 billion KRW the first half of 2020 by hiring him as a model. In early 2022, Ildong Foodis announced Himmune, known as Jang Minho Protein, has accumulated 130 billion KRW in cumulative sales.

Beginning on May 6, 2022, Jang embarked on the joint concert tour 'Min-Won Satisfied' with Lee Chan-won. Tickets for the concert, performing in four cities, were sold out all 16,000 seats as soon as they opened.

Starting from Seoul at Olympic Hall, Olympic Park on November 4, 2022, Jang performs on his solo concert tour 'Ho-sijeol (Good old days)' in seven cities, including Daegu and Busan. It's his second solo concert since the first solo concert 'Drama' in 2021.

Personal life 
Despite his birthday being on September 11, he tends to celebrate by the lunar calendar (July 28). Fans often misunderstand and also get confused because the lunar calendar changes the date every year. He received a master's degree in Performing Arts from Dankook University Graduate School of Culture and Arts. Jang is fluent in Chinese.

Others 
Jang has been sponsoring three children through Compassion Korea (한국컴패션) since 2009. Also he is active member of Compassion Band since 2006.

He writes lyrics and composes songs. He wrote the lyrics for his fellow singer Namgoong Moonjeong's song "Goodbye my youth" (잘있거라 내청춘) with the songwriter JMStyle. He wrote the lyrics and co-composed one of fans' favorite songs "You know my name" (내 이름 아시죠) thinking of his late father.

On March 21, 2021, his fans celebrated the 10th anniversary of his trot debut. They posted congratulatory advertisements on the billboards of bus stops, subway stations, and shopping malls, etc. In particular, his overseas fans even sent congratulatory videos to Times Square in New York.

Gallup Korea has revealed the results of its annual survey of the most loved artists and songs of the year. Jang ranked the eighth as the most influential singer with 8.5 percent of the vote in the over-40 age bracket.

Discography

Studio albums

Extended plays

Singles

Soundtrack appearances

Compilation albums 
Ppongsoongah School albums

PPongsoongah School is a TV variety show and it released digital albums regularly. Jang participated in all albums.

All Album info <뽕숭아학당 앨범>

Romantic Call Centre albums

Romantic Call Centre released a digital album every week. Jang participated all albums.

All Album info <사랑의 콜센타 앨범>

Mr. Trot albums

TV Chosun's survival audition show Mr. Trot released 9 albums including 2 instrumental albums. Five of the seven albums contain his songs. 

Other compilation albums

There are countless various albums containing Jang's hit songs.

Writing credits 
All song credits are adapted from the Korea Music Copyright Association's database.

Music videos

Filmography

Film

Listicles

See also
U-BeS
The Man Says
Drama
You Know My Name

References

External links 
Jang Minho on YouTube
Official Fan cafe

South Korean male singers
1977 births
Living people
Mr Trot participants
20th-century South Korean male singers
21st-century South Korean male singers
Trot singers
South Korean male pop singers
South Korean male singer-songwriters
Singing talent show winners
People from Busan
Dankook University alumni
South Korean male television actors
South Korean male models
South Korean male idols